Terence Jason Everitt (born June 5, 1974) is a  Democratic member of the North Carolina House of Representatives, who has represented the State's 35th district (including constituents in Northern Wake County) since 2019.

Career
Everitt unsuccessfully challenged Republican Chris Malone in the November 2016 election. In 2018 Everitt sought a rematch with Malone and won by a margin of 51 percent to 46 percent. In 2020, Everitt was re-elected by a margin of 50 to 45 percent over Republican challenger Fred Von Canon.

Electoral history

2020

2018

2016

Committee assignments

2021-2022 Session
Agriculture 
Banking 
Commerce 
Finance 
Judiciary IV

2019-2020 Session
Banking 
Commerce
Finance 
Judiciary

References

Living people
1974 births
People from Wake Forest, North Carolina
Rutgers University alumni
Columbus School of Law alumni
North Carolina lawyers
Democratic Party members of the North Carolina House of Representatives
21st-century American politicians